Melissa "Skeeter" Gentile is an American softball coach. Who was the former head coach at Eastern Michigan.

Early life and education
Gentile graduated from Wentzville High School. She played softball for Michigan from 1996 to 2000, where she was four-year letter winner. She graduated from the University of Michigan in 2000 with a bachelor's degree in kinesiology. She earned her master's degree in athletic administration from Central Michigan University in 2005.

Coaching career

Jacksonville
Melissa Gentile was the head coach of the Jacksonville softball program for one season. Following the 2006 season, on June 30, 2006, Gentile resigned as head coach of the Jacksonville softball program, her replacement would be the program's assistant coach Amanda Lehotak.

Eastern Michigan
On July 29, 2013, Melissa Gentile was announced as the new head coach of the Eastern Michigan softball program. On March 20, 2018, Eastern Michigan announced that they would be cutting four sports including the softball program effective at the end of the 2018 Spring season. On February 12, 2019, a judge ruled that Eastern Michigan must reinstate two women's programs including softball. It is unclear whether Gentile will return as coach. Eastern Michigan would not reinstate the softball program.

Head coaching record

College

References

Living people
1978 births
Michigan Wolverines softball players
Eastern Michigan Eagles softball coaches
Jacksonville Dolphins softball coaches
Softball players from Missouri
Female sports coaches
American softball coaches
People from O'Fallon, Missouri
Central Michigan Chippewas softball coaches